The 1990 Arkansas Razorbacks football team represented the University of Arkansas during the 1990 NCAA Division I-A football season.

Schedule

Roster
QB Quinn Grovey, Sr.

Season summary

Tulsa

References

Arkansas
Arkansas Razorbacks football seasons
Arkansas Razorbacks football